A cookie jar is a jar that holds cookies.

Cookie jar may also refer to:

Film and television
 Cookie Jar Group, a Canadian animation studio
 Cookie Jar Kids Network, a 2003–2011 children's programming block on FOX, MyNetworkTV, and The CW
 Cookie Jar Toons, a 2008–2013 daily children's programming block on This TV
 Cookie Jar TV, a 2006–2013 children's programming block on CBS

Music
#Cookie Jar (EP), by Red Velvet, 2018
"#Cookie Jar" (Red Velvet song), 2018
 "Cookie Jar" (Gym Class Heroes song), 2008
 "Cookie Jar", a song by Doja Cat from Amala, 2018
 "Cookie Jar", a song by Jack Johnson from On and On, 2003

Other uses
 "Cookie Jar" (short story), a 2016 story by Stephen King
 Cookie Jar Butte, a summit in Utah, US
 The Cookie Jar Foundation, a charity based in Scotland

See also
 Cookie jar accounting, an accounting practice
 "Who stole the cookie from the cookie jar?", a children's sing-along game